Life of the River is a public sculpture walk along the Fox River on downtown Green Bay's section of the Fox River State Recreational Trail. It is a privately funded public art initiative administered by the Green Bay Neighborhood Leadership Council and the City of Green Bay.

Public art

References

Tourist attractions in Brown County, Wisconsin
Culture of Green Bay, Wisconsin
Outdoor sculptures in Wisconsin